Dodson Branch is a census-designated place and unincorporated community in Jackson County, Tennessee, United States. Its population was 1,044 as of the 2020 census.

Demographics

References

Census-designated places in Jackson County, Tennessee
Census-designated places in Tennessee
Unincorporated communities in Tennessee